Combrée is a former commune in the Maine-et-Loire department in western France. On 15 December 2016, it was merged into the new commune Ombrée d'Anjou. Its population was 2,783 in 2019.

Geography
The river Verzée forms all of the commune's southern border.

Demographics

Population characteristics as of 2014:

See also
Communes of the Maine-et-Loire department

References

Former communes of Maine-et-Loire